Flight 811 may refer to:

 China Airlines Flight 811, crash-landed on Manila on February 27, 1980
 Aeroflot Flight 811, collided mid-air on 24 August 1981
 China Airlines Flight 811, on 21 August 1983, Ninoy Aquino was assassinated while deplaning; see Assassination of Ninoy Aquino
 United Airlines Flight 811, suffered explosive decompression on 24 February 1989

See also

 811 (disambiguation)

0811